John Hunter (1875 – 1950) was a Scottish footballer who played in the Football League for Preston North End.

References

1875 births
1950 deaths
Scottish footballers
Scottish Football League players
English Football League players
Association football wing halves
St Mirren F.C. players
Preston North End F.C. players
Portsmouth F.C. players
Lisburn Distillery F.C. players